The English Way of Death is an original novel written by Gareth Roberts and based on the long-running British science fiction television series Doctor Who. It features the Fourth Doctor, Romana II and K-9. It takes place immediately after the Missing Adventure The Romance of Crime, also by Gareth Roberts.

This book was republished by BBC Books in 2015 as part of the History Collection.

Plot
Summer, 1930. London is in a heatwave. The Doctor, Romana and K-9 come to holiday but uncover time pollution locally.
What connects the isolated Sussex resort of Nutchurch with a secret society? What is the involvement of millionaire Hepworth Stackhouse? And what is the deadly green vapour?

Audio adaptation 
Big Finish Productions, an audio production company based in the United Kingdom, announced they were doing an audio adaptation of this story starring Tom Baker and Lalla Ward, respectively. It was released in January 2015.

External links
The English Way of Death at Big Finish

Reviews
 

Fiction set in 1930
1996 British novels
1996 science fiction novels
Virgin Missing Adventures
Fourth Doctor novels
Novels by Gareth Roberts (writer)